Ralco National Reserve is a national reserve of Chile. The dominant feature of the reserve is Callaqui volcano.

References

National reserves of Chile
Protected areas of Biobío Region